is a Japanese rock band, formed by Ryōta Fujimaki, Keisuke Maeda and Osamu Jingūji in 2000.

History
Remioromen was formed in December 2000 with their current three person line up. They say that the name of the band has no real significance as a whole　and was instead the result of wordplay. Playing stones scissors and paper they allowed winners to decide one or more syllables first and losers to decide more syllables later. Fujimaki won and chose the first syllable from the Japanese phoneticization of the British band he liked "Radiohead", "re." Osamu Jingūji came second and chose his girlfriend's and his own given names' first syllables, "mio." Maeda came third, and since he liked trams, chose the first three syllables from the Japanese for tram "romendensha" (lit. road face train)". On November 25 of 2003 they did their first one-man live at Shibuya-AX. Since their inception the band has been steadily climbing to the top of the Oricon charts. For the release of Sangatsu Kokonoka (3月9日) (March 9) they returned to their home town in the Yamanashi Prefecture to perform live in their old school's gymnasium. In 2005 Sangatsu Kokonoka was used in a choral arrangement for the drama Ichi Rittoru no Namida (1 Litre Of Tears) and "Konayuki" was used as the insert song. For the release of the single Sangatsu Kokonoka was included in an arrangement with a string quartet. This gained the band a great deal of popularity and "Konayuki" became one of the best selling singles of 2005. Their third album Horizon has had high sales, making it # 1 on the Oricon Album charts for three weeks.

The first track in their album Kaze no Chroma, entitled "Tsubasa", was the ending theme in the movie Major: Yuujou no Winning Shot which was based on the hit baseball manga made by Takuya Mitsuda.

Though Remioromen has never had a single rank at number 1, their recent releases have stayed on the charts for long periods of time and their overall sales have been quite high. Remioromen generally sticks to laid back pop/rock with catchy hooks.

In MTV Video Music Awards Japan 2006 (MTV VMAJ 2006) Remioromen Music Video "Konayuki" won The Best Pop Video Award.

On 1 February 2012, an official announcement was made on their website, stating the suspension of the group. No explanations were given for the suspending of the band's activity.

Ryota Fujimaki, the lead vocalist and guitarist, debuted on 17 October 2012, with a solo album titled Ookami Seinen (オオカミ青年).

Members
  (b. January 12, 1980) is vocalist and plays guitar.
  (b. September 11, 1979) plays bass guitar.
  (b. March 5, 1980) plays drums.

Discography

Albums

Studio albums

Compilation albums

Live albums

Mini-albums

Singles
  (21 May 2003) {#43 Oricon}
  (20 August 2003) {#29 Oricon}
  (9 March 2004) {#11 Oricon}
  (19 May 2004) {#17 Oricon}
  (12 January 2005) {#8 Oricon}
  (9 February 2005) {#9 Oricon}
  (12 October 2005) {#2 Oricon}
  (16 November 2005) {#2 Oricon}
  (1 March 2006) {#2 Oricon}
  (14 March 2007) {#3 Oricon}
 /RUN (9 May 2007) {#4 Oricon}
 Wonderful & Beautiful (12 December 2007) {#3 Oricon}
 Motto Tooku E (30 July 2008) {#6 Oricon}
 Yume no Tsubomi (7 January 2009) {#3 Oricon}
 Starting Over (15 July 2009) {#4 Oricon}
   (25 November 2009) {#10 Oricon}
   (28 July 2010) {#13 Oricon}

Digital singles
 Sakura (14 February 2009)
   (17 February 2010)
 Your Song (19 January 2011)

External links
Official Japanese Website
Official Blog Website
Remioromen profile at JaME

Japanese rock music groups
Japanese pop rock music groups
Musical groups from Yamanashi Prefecture